Benjamin Bonzi (born 9 June 1996) is a French professional tennis player. Bonzi has a career-high ATP singles ranking of world No. 42 achieved on 6 February 2023. He also has a career high doubles ranking of world No. 121 achieved on 19 September 2022.

Junior career
Bonzi won the 2014 French Open boys' doubles title with partner Quentin Halys after defeating Lucas Miedler and Akira Santillan in the final in straight sets.

Professional career

2017: Grand Slam debut & first win at the French Open
A wildcard entry for the 2017 French Open, he won the match over Daniil Medvedev after his retirement in the first round, before losing to 19th seed Albert Ramos Vinolas in the second round.

2018: Wimbledon debut
Bonzi qualified for the 2018 Wimbledon Championships, defeating Britain's James Ward in the final qualifying round, but lost to Lukáš Lacko in the first round of the main draw.

2019: First Mixed doubles Major quarterfinal & ATP doubles final
He reached the quarterfinals of the 2019 French Open in mixed doubles as a wildcard partnering compatriot Amandine Hesse, where they lost to eventual champions Ivan Dodig and Latisha Chan.

He made his first final in doubles as a wildcard partnering compatriot Antoine Hoang at the 2019 Open Sud de France, where they lost to top seeds Édouard Roger-Vasselin and Ivan Dodig.

2020: French Open doubles third round
Bonzi qualified for the 2020 French Open, beating Ivo Karlović amongst others in qualifying. In the first round, Bonzi defeated Finland's Emil Ruusuvuori, before losing in a second round clash against teenage Italian Jannik Sinner. 
In doubles as a wildcard he reached the third round of a Grand Slam for the first time in his career partnering Antoine Hoang where they were defeated by 8th seeded German duo and eventual champions from Germany, Kevin Krawietz and Andreas Mies.

2021: Historic six Challengers record, First Wimbledon win, Top 60

Bonzi started the year winning his first and second Challengers in Potchefstroom and Ostrava. In July, Bonzi qualified for the Wimbledon and reached the second round for the first time, after defeating fellow qualifier Marco Trungelliti in the first round. He then lost to 32nd seed Marin Čilić in the second round.

He made his top 100 debut after winning the Segovia Challenger over Tim van Rijthoven, jumping 16 spots at a new career high of No. 95 in the world on 2 August 2021. He was the top seed in qualifying at the 2021 US Open, but lost to American Aleksandar Kovacevic in the second round. That same month, he won his fourth Challenger title in Saint-Tropez. He then won two more back-to-back Challengers in France in Cassis and Rennes, his fifth and sixth of 2021, making it three titles on home soil in three weeks with just three combined sets lost. He was the first player to go back-to-back-to-back on the circuit since Mikhail Youzhny in 2016. He joined Facundo Bagnis (2016), Juan Ignacio Chela (2001) and Younes El Aynaoui (1998) as the only players to lift six singles trophies in one season in ATP Challenger history. As a result, he reached a new career-high of World No. 61 on 20 September 2021. He subsequently reached the top 60 on 1 November 2021.

2022: First ATP semifinal & Masters 1000 third round, top 50
On his debut at the 2022 Australian Open, he won his first match at this Grand Slam, defeating Peter Gojowczyk.

After the withdrawal of eighth seed Gianluca Mager, Bonzi became the ninth seed at the Open 13 in Marseilles, where he beat Kamil Majchrzak, defending finalist Pierre-Hugues Herbert and fourth seed Aslan Karatsev, his first career top-20 win, to reach his first career semifinal on the ATP Tour. He lost to second seed Andrey Rublev in the semifinals.

On his debut at the Indian Wells Masters, he reached the third round for the first time at this level, defeating 21st seed Lorenzo Sonego before losing to 10th seed Jannik Sinner.

At the 2022 Mallorca Championships he reached the quarterfinals by defeating World No. 15 and third seed Denis Shapovalov in the second round. He reached second career semifinal on the ATP Tour
without dropping a set in his three previous matches, defeating Daniel Altmaier in the quarterfinals. As a result, he reached the top 50 in the ATP singles rankings. He reached the second round at the 2022 Wimbledon Championships for a second consecutive year.

At the 2022 Winston-Salem Open he defeated Kyle Edmund in the second round. Next he defeated Thiago Monteiro to reach the quarterfinals.

Bonzi won his first match at the US Open on his debut, after beating compatriot Ugo Humbert in five sets. He lost in the second round to Nick Kyrgios.

2023: First two ATP finals & Major singles third round and doubles quarterfinal 
Bonzi made his first final in Pune, beating Tseng Chun-hsin, Emil Ruusuvuori, Filip Krajinović and Botic van de Zandschulp on his way there. He lost to Tallon Griekspoor in three sets in his maiden ATP Tour final.

At the 2023 Australian Open he reached the third round of a Grand Slam for the first time in his career, defeating 14th seed Pablo Carreno Busta in five sets, coming from 2-0 sets down, before losing to 22nd seed Alex de Minaur in straight sets. At the same tournament he reached the quarterfinals in doubles with partner Arthur Rinderknech also for the first time at a Major, where they lost to eventual runners-up Hugo Nys and Jan Zielinski.

In February, at the 2023 Open 13 Provence he reached the semifinals again for a second year in a row at this tournament defeating two seeds, fifth seed Maxime Cressy and third seed Alex de Minaur, getting his revenge for the Australian Open loss in January. He reached his second final of the season and of his career defeating compatriot Arthur Fils. He lost to top seed Hubert Hurkacz in the final in straight sets.

Singles performance timeline

Current through the 2023 Australian Open .

ATP career finals

Singles: 2 (2 runner-ups)

Doubles: 1 (1 runner-up)

ATP Challenger & ITF Futures finals

Singles: 29 (19–10)

Doubles (26–14)

Junior Grand Slam finals

Boys' doubles

Record against top-10 players

Bonzi's record against those who have been ranked in the top 10, with active players in boldface. Only ATP Tour main draw matches are considered:

Notes

References

External links

 
 
 
 

1996 births
Living people
French male tennis players
French Open junior champions
Sportspeople from Nîmes
People from Vincennes
Sportspeople from Val-de-Marne
Grand Slam (tennis) champions in boys' doubles
21st-century French people